A Cafeteria Catholic is a Catholic who dissents from the doctrinal or moral teachings of the Catholic Church, including those  who choose not to receive one or more of the seven sacraments (for example thinking confession to a priest is not necessary to have sins forgiven), and not to follow Catholic teachings on sexual morality, abortion, birth control, divorce, premarital sex, masturbation, pornography, prostitution and homosexual acts.

Use in print
An early use in print of "cafeteria Catholic" appears in 1971:

A later use of "cafeteria Catholicism" appears in Fidelity, 1986.

A different distinction, in the term "communal Catholicism", had already been used in 1976.

Use of the term
The term is most often used by conservative Catholics critical of progressive Catholics.  The term has been in use since the issuance of Humanae Vitae, an official document that propounded the Church's opposition to the use of artificial birth control and advocates natural family planning.

It is often a synonymous phrase for "Catholic-in-name-only" (or CINO), "dissident Catholic", "heretical Catholic", "cultural Catholic"/"cultural Christian", "à la carte Catholic", or "liberal Catholic".

The term has no status in official Catholic teachings. However, the practice of denying adherence to the sexual morality of the Church has been criticized by Pope John Paul II stated in his talk to the Bishops in Los Angeles in 1987:

During morning Mass at the Domus Sanctae Marthae, Pope Francis, speaking rather of half-hearted Catholics, said, "They may call themselves Catholic, but they have one foot out the door."

Surveys on dissenting Catholic laity
In 2014, the U.S. Spanish-language network Univision commissioned a World Values Survey of 12,038 self-identified Catholics in 12 countries with substantial Catholic populations across the world, representing 61% of the world’s Catholic population and covering nine languages spread across five continents. It found that majorities of Catholics globally and in most regions disagree with Church teachings on divorce, abortion, and contraception, with greater intra- and inter-national division on gay marriage and the ordination of women and divorced men. Favourable views about the Pope (Francis) did not influence Catholics who disagree with at least some of the church's teachings. Overall, a higher proportion of Third World Roman Catholics (notably Africa and the Philippines) accept the official doctrines on these subjects, while those in Western countries tend to disagree with many of them. 

The founder of World Values Survey, Ronald Inglehart said:

Francis has requested that parishes provide answers to an official questionnaire regarding the current opinions among the laity. He has also continued to assert present Catholic doctrine in less dramatic tone than his more direct predecessors who maintained that the Catholic Church is not a democracy of popular opinion.

Francis launched his own survey of Catholic opinion in November 2013. Religion sociologist Linda Woodhead of Lancaster University writes, "it’s not a survey in any sense that a social scientist would recognize."  Woodhead feels many ordinary Catholics will have difficulty understanding theological jargon there.  Still Woodhead suspects the survey may be influential.

Notable proponents 
Some notable Catholics have either been explicitly associated or identified with the term. Politician James Carville, a Democrat, has been described as "the ultimate cafeteria Catholic". Carville said, "Everybody in some way or another takes what they want. The real thing is how we treat each other." Author Mary Karr, a convert from agnosticism, was also reported to have been a dissenter of some Catholic teaching. Having been a feminist since she was 12, Karr is pro-choice on abortion and she supports the ordination of women to the priesthood. British actress Patsy Kensit said in an interview with The Guardian that she is an à la carte Catholic, though appreciative of "all the pomp and ceremony" of the church.

See also

Apostasy
Biblical law in Christianity
Cafeteria Christianity
Cafeteria Christians
Catholic atheism
Cultural Christian
Heresy
Humanistic Judaism
Jack Mormon
Lapsed Catholic
Mater si, magistra no
Moralistic therapeutic deism
Nicodemite (Crypto-Protestantism, Crypto-Judaism, Crypto-Islam)
Nominal Christian
Recovering Catholic
Criticism of the Catholic Church § Partial commitment

References 

Neologisms
Criticism of the Catholic Church
1980s neologisms
Catholic culture